Venčac (Serbian Cyrillic: Венчац) is a mountain in central Serbia, near the town of Aranđelovac. Its highest peak has an elevation of 659 meters above sea level. It is well known by its mine of white marble. Some parts of White House, Washington, D.C. are built from this quality material from Venčac.

See also
Bukulja

References

External links 
Vencac marble mine

Mountains of Serbia